Mount Chalmers is a mountain in Antarctica along the eastern escarpment of the Conway Range, about  south of the summit of Mount Keltie. It was discovered by the British National Antarctic Expedition, 1901–04, and named for Robert Chalmers (later Baron of Northiam), Assistant Secretary to the Treasury, 1903–07.

References 

Mountains of Oates Land